True Nobility is a 1916 American silent drama directed by Donald MacDonald starring Helene Rosson and Forrest Taylor.

Cast
 Helene Rosson as Effie Marsh
 Forrest Taylor as Phil Burton
 Lizette Thorne as Jean Bradford
 Charles Newton as Mr. Burton
 Eugenie Forde as Countess Nicasio
 Harry McCabe as Count Nicasio
 Marie Van Tassell as Mrs. Burton
 Harry von Meter as Lord Devlin

External links

1916 films
1916 drama films
Silent American drama films
American silent short films
American black-and-white films
1916 short films
1910s American films